Urbani izziv (English: Urban Challenge) is a biannual peer-reviewed academic journal published by the Urban Planning Institute of the Republic of Slovenia. It was established in December 1989 and covers all aspects of urban planning and urban studies. The journal is published in English and Slovenian.

Structure 
The journal is divided into two parts. The first (longer) part is titled "Articles" and includes original research, review articles, and short and technical studies. The second (shorter) part of the journal is titled "Reviews and information" and contains reviews, announcements (e.g., announcements of books, projects, events, lectures, conferences, etc.), library information, and other material. The latter part is not peer reviewed.

Abstracting and indexing 
The journal is abstracted and indexed in: 
 Scopus
 EBSCO databases
 ProQuest databases
 Central and Eastern European Online Library
 International Bibliography of Periodical Literature in the Humanities and Social Sciences

See also 
 List of academic journals published in Slovenia

References

External links 
 

English-language journals
Urban studies and planning journals
Environmental studies journals
Multilingual journals
Biannual journals
Publications established in 1989
Academic journals of Slovenia